The Tiki Ti is a Polynesian-themed tiki bar on Sunset Boulevard, in the Los Feliz district of Los Angeles.

Established in 1961 by Ray Buhen, the Tiki Ti's only employees, Mike Sr. and Mike Jr. Buhen are also the sole owners.  The establishment is only open part of the week, closing instead on Sundays, Mondays and Tuesdays. The bar is a well known stop as an underground landmark, often serving as a prelude stop before attending other clubs in the popular Silverlake/Hollywood area. The bartenders are known for their "heavy" pours and specialty drinks like the "Blood and Sand," where patrons synchronously yell "Toro, Toro, Toro" while the drink is topped off with tequila, an homage to the 1941 Tyrone Power film about bullfighting.  The other chanting drink is the "Uga Booga" where patrons yell "ooga booga" as the drink is being prepared.  

The Tiki Ti does not have a happy hour, but on Wednesdays the "Ray's Mistake" cocktail is reduced in price.  Also on that day, Mike will raise a toast to his father, Ray Buhen.  The strongest drink is purported to be the "Stealth."

Although the Tiki-Ti does not serve typical bar cocktails such as the martini, the cosmopolitan or beer, their drink menu does consist of over 80 exotic drinks—many of which are originals.  Drink names are colorful and include Yellow Bird, Laka Nuki, Bayanihan, Bonnie & Clyde and the Missionary's Downfall, just to name a few.  For those who cannot decide what drink to choose, the bar offers a wheel that patrons can spin to help them make up their mind.

See also 
Mai-kai restaurant

External links
 Official website
 Calendar

Landmarks in Los Angeles
Tiki bars
Drinking establishments in California
Los Feliz, Los Angeles